The 2018 Fermanagh Senior Football Championship was the 112th edition of the Fermanagh GAA's premier club Gaelic football tournament for senior clubs in County Fermanagh, Northern Ireland. The tournament consists of 8 teams, with the winner representing Fermanagh in the Ulster Senior Club Football Championship. The championship had a straight knock-out format.

Derrygonnelly Harps were the three-time defending champions, having beaten Devenish St Mary's in the previous years final.

Derrygonnelly successfully defended their title to claim their fourth championship in a row by beating Ederney St Joseph's in the final.

Team Changes
The following teams have changed division since the 2017 championship season.

To Championship
Promoted from 2017 Intermediate Championship
 Belcoo O'Rahillys - (Intermediate Champions)

From Championship
Relegated to 2018 Intermediate Championship
 Kinawley Brian Borus - (Relegation Play-off Losers)

Bracket

Quarter-finals

Semi-finals

Final

Relegation Playoffs
The four losers of the quarter-finals playoff in this round. The two losers will face off in a relegation final, with the loser to be relegated to the 2019 Intermediate Championship.

Relegation semi-finals

Relegation final

Ulster Senior Club Football Championship

References

Fermanagh Senior Football Championship
Fermanagh SFC
Fermanagh Senior Football Championship